Paul Drennan Cravath (July 14, 1861 – July 1, 1940) was a prominent Manhattan lawyer and presiding partner of the New York law firm Cravath, Swaine & Moore. He devised the Cravath System, was a leader in the Atlantist movement, and was a founding member and director of the Council on Foreign Relations.

Early life and education
Cravath was born July 14, 1861 to Ruth Anna Jackson, a Pennsylvania Quaker, and abolitionist Erastus Milo Cravath, a descendant of French Huguenots who was a co-founder and president of Fisk University.

Cravath graduated from Oberlin College in 1882, where he was considered both "brilliant" and a prankster. Oberlin also awarded him an honorary A.M. degree in 1887.

He embarked on the study of law in 1882, which was interrupted, three months later, when he contracted typhoid fever. Recovered, Cravath worked for the Globe Oil Company, a subsidiary of Standard Oil, as a salesman, then resumed his law studies in 1884, financed by his earned wages. At school, he worked as a tutor; vacation time was spent in Minnesota, working on his father's farm and visiting Quaker relatives. Cravath graduated cum laude from Columbia Law School in 1886; he was awarded the school's first Municipal Law prize.

Law career
While at Columbia, Cravath was a law student with the firm of Martin & Smith, and was admitted to the New York State Bar Association in June 1886. An early client was George Westinghouse, who was being sued by the Edison Illuminating Company for infringing on Thomas Edison's incandescent lamp patent.

He joined the law firm of Blatchford, Seward & Griswold in 1899. His book of business included Bethlehem Steel, Baltimore and Ohio Railroad, Kuhn, Loeb & Co., Chemical Bank, E. R. Squibb & Sons, Columbia Gas & Electric, and Studebaker Corp. His name was added to the firm's moniker in 1901.

Cravath was the authoritative head of the firm from 1906 until his death in 1940, and his formal statement of his conceptions of proper management of a law office still controls its operations. Cravath, Swaine & Moore endures as a leading law firm, and celebrated its 200th anniversary in 2019.

Cravath System

His law firm growth and operating structure remains widely known today as the Cravath System. White Shoe author John Oller credits the Cravath System as the model adopted by virtually all white-shoe law firms in the early 20th century, 50 years before the phrase white shoe came into use. The Cravath System has been partially adopted by most large law firms.

Foreign policy

As a leader of the Atlanticist movement, Cravath was influential in foreign policy. The organization was composed of influential lawyers, bankers, academics, and politicians of the Northeastern United States, who committed to a strand of Anglophile internationalism. For Cravath, the First World War served as an epiphany, building a deep concern with foreign policy that dominated his remaining career. Fiercely Anglophile, he demanded American intervention in the war against Germany. His goal was to build close Anglo-American cooperation that would be the guiding principle of postwar international organization.

He was one of the founding officers of the Council on Foreign Relations in 1921. The founding president of the CFR was John W. Davis, a name partner of the law firm Davis Polk & Wardwell, while Cravath served as the inaugural vice-president.

Cravath was awarded the Distinguished Service Medal by General Pershing, in 1919, for "exceptionally meritorious conduct and services during the war." He was also made a knight of the Legion of Honor by the French government, which also honored Cravath with a "special war cross".

Fisk University
Cravath spent most of his childhood in Nashville, Tennessee, where his father, Reverend Erastus Milo Cravath, was a co-founder of Fisk University, and served as its first president from 1875 to 1900. Cravath later served as a member and chairman of the Fisk Board of Trustees for over 30 years, until his death in 1940.

Personal life

In 1892, he married the opera singer Agnes Huntington. Their daughter, Vera Agnes Huntington Cravath (1895–1985), was born on August 28, 1895. Reported on page one of The New York Times, the couple became legally and permanently separate, in 1926, while remaining married. Their daughter, then separated from her first husband, moved in with her father until her second marriage the following year.

Vera Cravath married at least twice: to Lt. James Satterthwaite Larkin, about 1917, with whom she had a son, Adrian Cravath Larkin (who died in 2014, aged 94), then to William Francis Gibbs, in 1927, with whom she had two sons. She died in Rockport, Massachusetts in July 1985.

Cravath was a director of the New York Symphony Society and the Juilliard School of Music, and became chairman of the Metropolitan Opera in 1931 and was subsequently profiled by The New Yorker in its first January 1932 issue. He died in 1940.

In popular culture
A fictionalized Cravath (name unchanged) is the protagonist in Graham Moore's
2016 historical novel The Last Days of Night, which received generally positive reviews, A cinematic adaptation of the "historical thriller" is in development, starring Eddie Redmayne as Cravath.

References

External links

 

Cravath, Swaine & Moore

1861 births
1940 deaths
Metropolitan Opera people
People from Berlin Heights, Ohio
New York (state) lawyers
Oberlin College alumni
Columbia Law School alumni
American law firm executives
Cravath, Swaine & Moore partners